Kryptonita is a 2015 Argentine action drama fantasy film co-written and directed by Nicanor Loreti and starring Pablo Rago, Lautaro Delgado, Juan Palomino and Diego Capusotto and based on the novel of the same name by Leonardo Oyola. The story uses Elseworlds' famous structure of alternative stories to adapt DC's Justice League superheroes to a suburban setting in Argentina, where Superman and his team are a gang with a low class background battling a corrupt police force and local versions of Doomsday and the Joker. It was officially released in the 2015 edition of the Mar del Plata International Film Festival.

After the success of the film, it was announced that the story would be adapted as a TV series sequel for the Argentine cable television channel Space. The series is titled Nafta Super and it premiered on November 16 of 2016. Nafta Super is a direct sequel to the film, picking up a few months after the story for Kryptonita ended, and with most of the original cast returning for a total of eight episodes.

Synopsis 
In an alternative world, Superman has not been raised as a child in the United States, but instead in La Matanza ("The Slaughter" in Spanish), a working-class urban area near Buenos Aires, where he and the other members of the Justice League (Flash, Wonder Woman, Green Lantern, Hawkgirl, Batman and Martian Manhunter) have grown up to become antiheroes. Superman becomes known as "Nafta Super", and together with his friends they form the Nafta Super Gang, who rob banks and help the poor people in the city of La Matanza -a partido (county) located in the urban agglomeration of Greater Buenos Aires (Buenos Aires Province)- by giving them the stolen money.

Nafta Super and his gang (which includes a transvestite Wonder Woman) are enemies with another gang led by a bald gangster (Lex Luthor), and also fight corrupt elements of the Bonaerense police which are seeking to stop their "Robin Hood" ways. One night, Nafta Super is badly hurt by a piece of kryptonite and is taken by his gang to a Hospital, where his life is saved by a terrified doctor. Shortly after, the Bonaerense police appears looking for Super's capture -or even better, his death-, aided by Corona (The Joker; Corona is "Crown" in Spanish), a scheming negotiator, and Turtle Head (Doomsday), a powerful member of GEOF Special Operations.

Cast 
 Juan Palomino as Nafta Super/El Pini/Pinino (Superman)
 Pablo Rago as El Federico (Batman)
 Lautaro Delgado as Lady Di (Wonder Woman/Diana Prince)
 Diego Velázquez as Doctor González/"El Tordo"
 Nicolás Vázquez as Faisán (Green Lantern)
 Diego Capusotto as Corona (Joker)
 Diego Cremonesi as Ráfaga (Flash)
 Sofía Palomino as Cuñatai Güirá (Hawkgirl)
 Carca as Juan Raro (Martian Manhunter/J'onn J'onzz)
 Pablo Pinto as Turtle Head/Oficial Cabeza de Tortuga (Doomsday)
 Sebastián De Caro as Lieutenant Ranni/Teniente Ranni (James Gordon)
 Gabriel Schultz as Police Officer/Oficial Olfa (Harvey Bullock)
 Susana Varela as Nurse Nilda/Enfermera Nilda
 Luis Ziembrowski as Detective Ventura

References

External links
 
 Kryptonita at Cinenacional.com
 Kryptonite at Mar del Plata International Film Festival (Official Site)

2010s crime films
2010s fantasy action films
2015 films
2010s Spanish-language films
Films shot in Buenos Aires
Argentine action films
2015 independent films
2010s superhero films
Crossover films
Parodies of Superman
2010s Argentine films